Yang Rong-hwa (19 September 1942 – 2005) was a Taiwanese cyclist. He competed in the team time trial at the 1964 Summer Olympics.

References

External links
 

1942 births
2005 deaths
Taiwanese male cyclists
Olympic cyclists of Taiwan
Cyclists at the 1964 Summer Olympics
Place of birth missing